The  Georgia Force season was the sixth season for the team in the Arena Football League. They went 14–2 and had the #2 spot in their conference in the AFL playoffs. They lost the National Conference Championship 56–66 to the Columbus Destroyers.

Coaching
Doug Plank, head coach since 2005, entered his third year as Force head coach.

Season schedule

Playoff schedule

Stats

Offense

Quarterback

Running backs

Wide receivers

Touchdowns

Defense

Special teams

Kick return

Kicking

External links
Georgia Force official stats page

Georgia
Georgia Force seasons
2007 in sports in Georgia (U.S. state)